End Transmission is the fourth studio album by American hardcore punk band Snapcase. The album was released on September 24, 2002 through Victory Records.

Musical style and sound
End Transmission has been described as hardcore punk, emo, and melodic hardcore. While the album still retains the aggressiveness of the band's previous material, the album has a greater focus on melody and ambience, resulting in a sound comparable to Quicksand and Deftones.

Track listing

Personnel

Snapcase
Daryl Taberski – vocals
Jon Salemi – guitar
Frank Vicario – guitar
Dustin Perry – bass
Timothy Redmond – drums

Additional
Brian McTernan – engineer, producer
Michael Barbiero – mixing
Mike Scielzi – mixing assistant
George Marino – mastering
John Kelson, Jr. – computers
Clint Woodside – design
Jess Kourkounis – photography

References

2002 albums
Victory Records albums
Albums produced by Brian McTernan